Steve Schaeffer is a Hollywood studio musician who has played on more than 1,000 feature films and original soundtracks.

Partial filmography

Inside Man (2006)
Blade Runner (1982)
Bowfinger (1999)
The Big Kahuna (1999)
The Rat Pack (1998)
That Thing You Do! (1996)
The Hard Way (1991)
The Meteor Man (film) (1993)
L.A. Confidential (1990)
Air Force One (1997)
The Edge (1997)
Along Came a Spider (2001)
Star Trek Nemesis (2002)
Looney Tunes: Back in Action (2003)
Close Encounters of the Third Kind (1977)
Amistad (1997)
Catch Me If You Can (2002)
War of the Worlds (2005)
Big (1988)
Mrs. Doubtfire (1993)
Seven (1995)
The Truth About Cats & Dogs (1996)
Panic Room (2002)
The Score (2001)
The Bodyguard (1992)
Forrest Gump (1994)
MouseHunt (1997)
Sarcasm (2000)
The Polar Express (2004)
The Mexican (2001)
Cast Away (2000)
What Women Want (2000)
Anastasia (1997)
Galaxy Quest (1999)
Ice Age (2002)
How to Lose a Guy in 10 Days (2003)
Serenity (2005)
The Fugitive (1993)
Outbreak (1995)
Space Jam (1996)
King Kong (2005)
Waiting to Exhale (1995)
Meet the Fockers (2004)
Pleasantville (1998)
Monsters, Inc. (2001)
War Horse (2011)
Toy Story (1995)
Cars (2006)
HouseSitter (1992)

References

American session musicians
Living people
Year of birth missing (living people)